Spongiispira is a bacteria genus from the family of Oceanospirillaceae with one known species (Spongiispira norvegica).

References

Oceanospirillales
Monotypic bacteria genera
Bacteria genera